Military Material Identification Division (aka Chuckwagon) is a division of the United States Department of Defense tasked with identifying and tracking the materials of war used in combat. Reports by Chuckwagon are generally classified.

See also
 Air Force Materiel Command

References

United States Department of Defense
Military intelligence collection